Simon Payaslian is an Armenian-American historian, author, editor, who has held the Charles K. and Elizabeth M. Kenosian Chair in Modern Armenian History and Literature at Boston University since 2007. From 2002 to 2007 he held the Kaloosdian/Mugar Chair in Armenian genocide Studies and Modern Armenian History at Clark University.

Payaslian is the nephew of Catholicos Zareh I.  His first doctoral degree was earned in Political Science from Wayne State University, after which he went on to earn a second doctoral degree in Armenian history at the University of California Los Angeles under Richard Hovannisian, where his dissertation was titled United States Policy toward the Armenian Question and the Armenian Genocide.

Works
The History of Armenia: From the Origins to the Present (2007)
United States Policy toward the Armenian Question and the Armenian Genocide (2005)
The Armenian Genocide, 1915–1923: A Handbook for Students and Teachers (2001)
International Political Economy: Conflict and Cooperation in the Global System (co-authored with Frederic S. Pearson) (1999; Chinese translation, Peking University Press, 2006)
U.S. Foreign Economic and Military Aid: The Reagan and Bush Administrations (1996).
He has co-edited (with Richard G. Hovannisian) two volumes, Armenian Constantinople (2010) and Armenian Cilicia (2008).

References

Year of birth missing (living people)
Living people
Syrian emigrants to the United States
21st-century American historians
People from Aleppo
Syrian people of Armenian descent
Clark University faculty
Boston University faculty
Wayne State University alumni
University of California, Los Angeles alumni
American male non-fiction writers
Ethnic Armenian historians